Thalasthanam is a 1992 Malayalam-language crime action film written by Renji Panicker, directed by Shaji Kailas and produced by S. Henry under the banner of Christ King Productions. The film stars Suresh Gopi in the lead role, along with Geetha, Narendra Prasad, Monisha, M. G. Soman, Ganesh Kumar and Vijayakumar in supporting roles. The basic plot revolves around Hari and his revenge against the people who murdered his brother, Unnikrishnan. The film explores the concepts of campus politics and the impact of anti social elements in students.  

The film was produced by S. Henry under the banner of Christ King Productions in their debut production venture. The distribution of the film was handled by Aardra Films Release. The film is believed to be based on Renji Panicker's experiences in campus politics, in which he was active in, during his collage days.The film was shot extensively in and around Kozhikode, Thiruvananthapuram and the Kerala University campus. Renji Panickar, Chippy and Vijayakumar debuted as actors through this film. Johnson composed the film's soundtrack and score, and Ravi K. Chandran was its cinematographer. Sasi Perumanoor and L. Bhoominathan were the film's art dir. and editor, respectively. 

The film was released on 12 July 1992 and was a blockbuster and was one of highest grossing Malayalam films of 1992. This film was a landmark film in Suresh Gopi's career as the success of the film established him as a bankable lead actor and was his first step towards superstardom. The film is also noted to be the first of the Shaji-Renji mass films which go on to become the outline of their future works. The film enjoys a cult status even after decades after its release. Narendra Prasad received praise for his performance as the antagonist. The film was remade in Telugu as Rajadhani.

Plot
Unnikrishnan is an easy going youth, who joins a law college, where he along with first-year students are ragged by seniors under the leadership of Pappan, a  student leader with strong political clout. Pappan violently thrashes down Unnikrishnan who opposes the ragging. After getting insulted in front of girls, Unnikrishnan stabs Pappan at the corridor of the college in retaliation. G. Parameshwaran aka G.P, Pappan's political mentor, orders his goons to bring Unnikrishnan. 

Upon recognizing the potential of Unnikrishnan, G.P inducts him into the party and strikes a truce between Pappan and Unnikrishnan. However, G.P had more sinister plans in stock. The bill on self-financing colleges was introduced by the Kerala government, where the party decides to oppose the bill under the leadership of G.P. and launch a student agitation campaign, where Unni is appointed as the leader of the movement. With the intention of spreading the violence throughout state, G.P decides to immolate Unni in front of the cops and press. 

Unni is killed, where his death is used as a powerful weapon by G.P against the government, but has also become a big blow to his family. Unni's elder brother Harikrishnan, arrives in Kerala from Mumbai to perform the funeral rituals, where he becomes suspicious about Unnikrishnan's death and decides to investigate the reason behind the murder. Harikrishnan faces the wrath from several corners including the college management, cops and local politicians, where his attempts to convince the C.M for an inquiry comes to no avail. 

Harikrishnan meets Meera, an aggressive journalist, who is the witness of Unnikrishnan's death. After learning about G.P's plans, Harikrishnan decides to fight against his violent political ways. where he faces several physical attacks from the hoodlums of G.P, but Harikrishnan manages to defeat them and burns G.P alive with the help of the college students.

Cast

Production
The film was shot in various locations including St. Joseph Devagiri College, Kozhikode, M.G. College, Thiruvananthapuram and Kerala university campus, Kariavattom, University Hostel Kariavattom Thiruvananthapuram.

Soundtrack
The film features original songs composed by Johnson, with lyrics written by O. N. V. Kurup and Gireesh Puthenchery.

Reception
Thalastaanam was released on 11 July 1992, in 15 centers in Kerala. Despite having a limited release, the film grossed 8 crore against the budget of 1 crore and became a commercial success at the box office. Narendra Prasad's performance is considered one of the best in his career. It was after the success of the film that he started essaying antagonistic roles in films like Ekalavyan, Aaraam Thampuran and Narasimham. The satellite rights of the film were sold to Amrita TV.

References

External links

Films directed by Shaji Kailas
1990s Malayalam-language films
Films scored by Johnson
1990s action films
1990 films
Indian political thriller films
Malayalam films remade in other languages
Films shot in Thiruvananthapuram
Films shot in Kozhikode